Castelmagno (DOP) is an Italian cheese  from the north-west Italian region Piedmont. It has a Protected Designation of Origin status in the European Union.

Historical notes
Castelmagno is a cheese which has been made for many centuries: the earliest known mention of it dates to  1277, when there is a record that Castelmagno was given as payment to the Marquis of Saluzzo in exchange for use of pasture lands in Castelmagno and Celle di Macra.

Zone of production
The cheese has traditionally been made in the Valle Grana in the south-west of the Province of Cuneo, where production is permitted today within the boundaries of the communes of Castelmagno, Pradleves and Monterosso Grana.

Process of production
Castelmagno is a semi-hard, half-fat cheese produced from whole cow's milk, obtained from cattle of the Piedmontese breed, fed on fresh forage or hay from mixed meadows or pasture. On occasion some milk from sheep or goats may be added to the cows' milk.

Uses

Aside from being eaten on its own, Castelmagno can be part of countless recipes, such as in fondue or veloutés and can be eaten along with rice, pasta, polenta, thinly sliced raw beef meat (carpaccio) or grilled vegetables.

See also
 Medieval cuisine
 List of cheeses

References

External links
Disciplinare di produzione 

Piedmontese cheeses
Italian cheeses
Cow's-milk cheeses
Italian products with protected designation of origin
Province of Cuneo
Cheeses with designation of origin protected in the European Union